The squirrel glider (Petaurus norfolcensis) is a nocturnal gliding possum.  The squirrel glider is one of the wrist-winged gliders of the genus Petaurus.

Habitat
This species' home range extends from Bordertown near the South Australian/Victorian Border through south-eastern Australia to northern Queensland. This species was thought to be extinct in South Australia since 1939 until a genetic test confirmed their inhabitance in this area.

The squirrel glider lives in south-eastern Australia in the dry sclerophyll forest and woodlands. In Queensland, however, they occupy a wetter eucalypt forest.

The glider will make a den in the hollow tree and line it with leaves. Here it will sleep and usually lives in groups of one male, 2 females, and offspring.

Appearance
Like most of the wrist-winged gliders, the squirrel glider is endemic to Australia. It is about twice the size of the related sugar glider (P. breviceps). Its body is 18–23 cm long and its tail measures at 22–33 cm long. It weighs about 230g or 0.5 lbs. They have blue-grey or brown-grey fur on their back and a white belly. The end of their tail is black and they have a black stripe from their eyes to the mid-back. They have a flying membrane that extends from their 5th front toe to the back of their foot on both sides. When they glide their prehensile tail can act as a rudder, allowing them to steer which direction they want to go. They can glide up to 50m from tree to tree. They tend not to glide in captivity.

Reproduction
The breeding season is between June and January. The gestation/pregnancy of a female is 18 days. The litter sizes are usually one to two offspring a year. The offspring will immediately crawl to the mother's marsupium and anchor itself to a teat where it will stay for about 3 months. The mother will wean off her offspring around 4 months while they stay in the den. The offspring become independent at 10 months and go off on their own. The life expectancy is 4–6 years.

Diet

The squirrel glider eats mostly fruit and insects. It also feeds on tree sap, mainly eucalyptus or red bloodwood trees. In order to get the sap the squirrel glider will pierce the trunk of the tree causing sap to flow out of it. It also eats pollen, nectar, leaves, and bark.

Threats
Natural predators of the squirrel glider include owls and introduced predators include dogs, cats and foxes. Habitat fragmentation and destruction by human agency is also impacting individual populations. However, due to large population sizes and occurrence in several protected areas, the species is currently classified as Least Concern (i.e. not yet threatened) by the IUCN.

Phylogeny
The squirrel glider's closest relatives come from the same genus, Petaurus, and they include the sugar glider (P. breviceps), mahogany glider (P. gracilis), northern glider (P. abidi), Biak glider (P. biacensis) and yellow-bellied glider (P. australis). It is not yet known which species the gliders diverged from. The squirrel glider most likely evolved from a marsupial like a possum that had membranes for gliding.  Other animals that have this same ancestor include Striped possum and Leadbeaters possum.

Analogous structures
Squirrel gliders are often mistaken for flying squirrels of North America. These two species are not related at all. The flying squirrel is a placental mammal and the squirrel glider is a marsupial like koalas and kangaroos.  Both have an adaptation for tree living – Patagia. This is the skin that extends from their front to hind legs allowing them to glide between the trees avoiding predators they might come into contact with on the ground. Because these animals are distantly related we call these characteristics analogous.

Homologous structures
Squirrel gliders are able to curl their tails around branches to hold on. This feature is homologous to the ring tail possum (order of Diprodontia) which use their tail as an extra limb to grab hold of trees. It is longer but the squirrel gliders tail is bushier.

References

Bibliography
 Cronin, Leonard — "Key Guide to Australian Mammals", published by Reed Books Pty. Ltd., Sydney, 1991 
 van der Beld, John — "Nature of Australia — A portrait of the island continent", co-published by William Collins Pty. Ltd. and ABC Enterprises for the Australian Broadcasting Corporation, Sydney, 1988 (revised edition 1992), 
 Russell, Rupert — "Spotlight on Possums", published by University of Queensland Press, St. Lucia, Queensland, 1980, 
 Troughton, Ellis — "Furred Animals of Australia", published by Angus and Robertson (Publishers) Pty. Ltd., Sydney, in 1941 (revised edition 1973), 
 Morcombe, Michael & Irene — "Mammals of Australia", published by Australian Universities Press Pty. Ltd., Sydney, 1974, 
 Ride, W. D. L. — "A Guide to the Native Mammals of Australia", published by Oxford University Press, Melbourne, 1970, 
 Serventy, Vincent — "Wildlife of Australia", published by Thomas Nelson (Australia) Ltd., Melbourne, 1968 (revised edition 1977), 
 Serventy, Vincent (editor) — "Australia's Wildlife Heritage", published by Paul Hamlyn Pty. Ltd., Sydney, 1975 of the marsupial family Petauridae.

External links
 Gliders in the Spotlight — Wildlife Preservation Society of Queensland
Keeping squirrel gliders in captivity (Marsupial Society)
Elizabeth Ann Flaherty: Locomotor performance and cost of transport in the squirrel glider, Petaurus Norfolcensis (Petauridae) (pdf)

Gliding possums
Marsupials of Australia
Mammals of New South Wales
Mammals of Queensland
Mammals of Victoria (Australia)
Extinct mammals of South Australia
Least concern biota of Australia
Mammals described in 1792